"De mí" (English: "From Me") is a song by Mexican pop group Camila, released on June 20, 2011 as the four single from their second album, Dejarte de Amar (2010). "Entre tus alas" was written by Mario Domm and produced by Domm. The song reached number three on the US Billboard Latin Pop Airplay charts. A video for the song, which was recorded in the Riviera Maya of Quintana Roo in Mexico, premiered in September 2011. The song was part of the soundtrack of the telenovela Teresa.

Music video
The music video was directed by Pedro Torres and filmed at Riviera Maya of Quintana Roo, Mexico. The video features the group playing the theme and touring the Riviera, while one member is being purified by what seems to be the healer of the tribe.

Charts

Certifications

Release history

See also
List of number-one songs of 2011 (Mexico)

References

2011 singles
Songs written by Mario Domm
Camila (band) songs
Spanish-language songs
Sony Music Latin singles
Pop ballads
Rock ballads
2011 songs